is an online free-to-play fantasy role-playing game created by Happy Elements. It was released in Japan in 2014 for Android and iOS devices. An anime television series adaptation by Encourage Films titled  aired from October 11 to December 27, 2018.

Characters

Media

Anime
An anime television series adaptation by Encourage Films titled  aired from October 11 to December 27, 2018 on AT-X and other channels. The opening theme is  performed by Mili. Crunchyroll streamed the series. The series was being simulcasted in Indonesia by Ponimu. The series ran for 12 episodes.

Notes

References

External links
 

2014 video games
Android (operating system) games
Anime television series based on video games
AT-X (TV network) original programming
Encourage Films
Free-to-play video games
Gacha games
IOS games
Japan-exclusive video games
Japanese role-playing video games
Video games developed in Japan
Video games scored by Tetsuya Shibata
Video games scored by Yoshino Aoki